The Strategic Petroleum Reserve (SPR) is an emergency stockpile of petroleum maintained by the United States Department of Energy (DOE). The United States started the petroleum reserve in 1975 to mitigate future supply disruptions as part of the international Agreement on an International Energy Program, after oil supplies were interrupted during the 1973–1974 oil embargo.

The current inventory is displayed on the SPR's website. However, the maximum total withdrawal capability from the SPR is only , so it would take about  days to use the entire inventory. At recent market prices ($58 a barrel as of March 2021), the SPR holds over $14.6 billion in sweet crude and approximately $18.3 billion in sour crude (assuming a $15/barrel discount for sulfur content). In 2012, the total value of the crude in the SPR was approximately $43.5 billion, while the price paid for the oil was $20.1 billion (an average of $28.42 per barrel).

Since 2015 Congress has mandated sales of oil from the reserve to fund federal spending. The U.S. Department of Energy has run at least seven sales since 2017, selling 132 million barrels, or about 18.2% of what had been in the reserve.

On March 31, 2022, President Joe Biden announced that his administration would release 1 million barrels of oil per day from the reserve for the next 180 days, selling it at an average price of $96 per barrel. After oil prices declined during the second half of the year, in December the administration announced it would begin replenishing the SPR in early 2023, expecting to purchase oil at a lower price than it was sold, a process that would take months or years to complete.

According to legislation already in place, the amount of oil in the reserve could fall to 238 million barrels by 2028. This will be a 67% reduction to the oil in the reservoir since 2010.

Facilities 

The SPR management office is located in Elmwood, Louisiana, a suburb of New Orleans.

The reserve is stored at four sites on the Gulf of Mexico, each located near a major center of petrochemical refining and processing. Each site contains a number of artificial caverns created in salt domes below the surface.

Almost $4 billion was spent on the facilities. The decision to store in caverns was made to reduce costs. The Department of Energy claims that it is approximately ten times more cost effective to store oil below the surface, with the added advantages of no leaks and a constant natural churn of the oil due to a temperature gradient in the caverns. The caverns were created by drilling down and then dissolving the salt with water.

Existing
 Big Hill: Winnie, Texas.
 West Hackberry: Lake Charles, Louisiana.
 Bayou Choctaw: Baton Rouge, Louisiana.

Proposed
Former Secretary of Energy Samuel Bodman announced the creation of this site in February 2007. As of 2008, this site was facing some opposition. According to the DOE: "Activities towards the goal of expansion of the SPR to one billion barrels, as directed by Congress in the 2005 Act, were cancelled in 2011 after Congress rescinded all remaining expansion funds."

Retired
This facility was a conventional room and pillar near-surface salt mine, formerly owned by Morton Salt. In 1993, a sinkhole formed on the site, allowing fresh water to intrude into the mine. Because of the mine's construction in salt deposits, fresh water would erode the ceiling, potentially causing the structure to fail. The mine was backfilled with salt-saturated brine. This process, which allowed for recovery of 98% of the petroleum stored in the facility, reduced the risk of further fresh water intrusion, and helped prevent the remaining oil from leaking into the aquifer that is located over the salt dome.

History

Background
The SPR was created following the 1973 energy crisis. On November 18, 1974, the United States became a signatory to the Agreement on an International Energy Program (IEP) and a founding member of the International Energy Agency that the IEP established. One of the key commitments made by the treaty's signatories is to maintain oil stocks of no less than 90 days of net imports.

Access to the reserve is determined by the conditions written into the 1975 Energy Policy and Conservation Act (EPCA), primarily to counter a severe supply interruption. Oil could begin entering the marketplace 13 days after a presidential order. The Department of Energy says it has about 59 days of import protection in the SPR. This, combined with private sector inventory protection, is estimated to equal 115 days of imports.

The EPCA of December 22, 1975, made it policy for the United States to establish a reserve up to 1 billion barrels (159 million m³) of petroleum. A number of existing storage sites were acquired in 1977. Construction of the first surface facilities began in June 1977. Fill was suspended in Fiscal Year 1995 to devote budget resources to refurbishing the SPR equipment and extending the life of the complex.

Repletion and suspension
On November 13, 2001, shortly after the September 11 terrorist attacks, President George W. Bush announced that the SPR would be filled, saying, "The Strategic Petroleum Reserve is an important element of our Nation's energy security. To maximize long-term protection against oil supply disruptions, I am directing the Secretary of Energy to fill the SPR up to its  capacity." Since the directive in 2001, the capacity of the SPR has increased by  due to natural enlargement of the salt caverns in which the reserves are stored. The Energy Policy Act of 2005 has since directed the Secretary of Energy to fill the SPR to the full  authorized capacity, a process which will require a physical expansion of the Reserve's facilities.

Approximately 60% of the crude oil in the reserve is the less desirable sour (high sulfur content) variety. The oil delivered to the reserve is "royalty-in-kind" oil—royalties owed to the U.S. government by operators who acquire leases on the federally owned Outer Continental Shelf in the Gulf of Mexico. These royalties were previously collected as cash, but in 1998 the government began testing the effectiveness of collecting royalties "in kind"—or in other words, acquiring the crude oil itself. This mechanism was adopted when refilling the SPR began, and once filling is completed, revenues from the sale of future royalties will be paid into the federal treasury.

On April 25, 2006, President Bush announced a temporary halt to petroleum deposits to the SPR as part of a four-point program to alleviate high fuel prices.

On January 23, 2007, President Bush suggested in his State of the Union speech that Congress should approve expansion of the current reserve capacity to twice its current level.

On May 16, 2008, the U.S. Department of Energy (DOE) said it would halt all deliveries to the Strategic Petroleum Reserve sometime in July. This announcement came days after Congress voted to direct the Bush administration to do the same.

The purchase would be funded by the roughly $600 million received from those emergency sales.

On September 9, 2011, a Notice of Cancellation was published in the Federal Register after Congress rescinded funding for the expansion of the Strategic Petroleum Reserve, reversing the SPR expansion initiative previously directed under the Energy Policy Act of 2005.

On October 20, 2014, a report by the U.S. Government Accountability Office (GAO) recommended reducing the size of the Reserve. According to the report, the amount of oil held in reserve exceeds the amount required to be kept on hand given the need for imported crude oil had decreased in recent years. The report said the DOE agreed with the GAO recommendation.

On March 19, 2020, President Donald Trump directed the Department of Energy to fill the Strategic Petroleum Reserve to maximum capacity. This directive was given to help support domestic oil producers given the impending economic collapse from COVID-19 and extreme drops in international oil markets. However, funding was blocked by Congress.

Emergency sales to Israel
According to the 1975 Sinai Interim Agreement signed by the United States and Israel, as a precondition for Israel's return of the Sinai Peninsula and its associated oil reserves to Egypt, in an emergency the United States was obligated to make oil available for sale to Israel for up to five years. Israel has never invoked the agreement , however. The agreement was extended in 1979, 1994, 2004, and, most recently, in 2015 for a ten-year period.

International obligations
As a member of the International Energy Agency (IEA), the United States must stock an amount of petroleum equivalent to at least 90 days of U.S. imports. The SPR contained an equivalent to 141 days of imports as of September 2016. The United States is also obligated to contribute 43.9% of petroleum in any IEA-coordinated release.

Limitations 
The Strategic Petroleum Reserve is primarily a crude petroleum reserve, not a stockpile of refined petroleum fuels such as gasoline, diesel and kerosene. Although the United States maintains some extra supply of refined petroleum fuels, e.g., the Northeast Home Heating Oil Reserve and Northeast Gasoline Supply Reserve under the aegis of the Department of Energy (DOE), the government does not maintain gasoline reserves on anything like the scale of the SPR. The SPR is intended to give the United States protection from disruptions in oil supplies. In the event of a major disruption to refinery operations, the United States would have to call on members of the International Energy Agency that stockpile refined products, and use refining capacities outside of the continental United States for relief.

There have been suggestions that the DOE should increase its supplies and stockpile both gasoline and jet fuel.
Some countries and zones have a strategic reserve of both petroleum and petroleum products. In some cases, this includes a strategic reserve of jet fuel.

Drawdowns

Petroleum sales - Prior to 2015
 1985: Test sale—
 1990–1991: Desert Storm sale—
  in October 1990 test sale
  in January 1991 presidentially ordered drawdown
 1996–1997:  non-emergency sales for deficit reduction
 July–August 2000:  to supply the Northeast Home Heating Oil Reserve.
 September–October 2000:  in response to a concern over low distillate levels in the northeastern U.S.
 2005 Hurricane Katrina sale: —Katrina shut down 95% of crude production and 88% of natural gas output in the Gulf of Mexico.  This amounted to a quarter of total U.S. output.  About 735 oil and natural gas rigs and platforms had been evacuated due to the hurricane.
 2011 Arab Spring sale: —non-emergency sale to offset disruptions caused by political upheaval in Libya and elsewhere in the Middle East. The amount was matched by IEA countries, for a total of  released from stockpiles around the world.

Petroleum exchanges and loans
Note: Loans are made on a case-by-case basis to alleviate supply disruptions. Once conditions return to normal, the loan is returned to the SPR with additional oil as interest.
 April–May 1996:  lent to ARCO to alleviate pipeline blockage.
 June 2000:  lent to Citgo and Conoco in response to shipping channel blockage.
 October 2002:  lent to Shell Pipeline Company in advance of Hurricane Lili.
 September–October 2004:  lent to Astra Oil, ConocoPhillips, Placid Refining, Shell Oil Company, and Premcor after Hurricane Ivan.
 September–October 2005:  lent to ExxonMobil, Placid Refining, Valero, BP, Marathon Oil, and TotalEnergies after Hurricane Katrina. Purchases of crude oil would then resume in January 2009 using revenues available from the 2005 Hurricane Katrina emergency sale. The DOE purchased  at a cost of $553 million.
 January–February 2006:  lent to Total Petrochemicals USA due to closure of the Sabine–Neches Waterway to deep-draft vessels after a barge accident in the channel.
 June 2006:  of sour crude lent to ConocoPhillips and Citgo due to the closure for several days of the Calcasieu Ship Channel caused by the release of a mixture of storm water and oil. Repaid in early October 2006.
 September 2008:  lent to Citgo, Placid Refining, and Marathon Oil due to disruptions from Hurricane Gustav.
 August 2017: 200,000 barrels of sweet crude and 300,000 barrels of sour crude were lent to Phillips 66 due to disruptions from Hurricane Harvey.

Drawdowns since 2015

Since 2015, Congress has been selling the oil in the reserve to fund the deficit, in unpublicized sales. The U.S. Department of Energy has run seven sales since 2017, selling more than 132 million barrels, or about 18.2% of what had been in the reserve.

According to legislation already in place, the amount of oil in the reserve could fall to as little as 238 million barrels by 2028.  This will be a 67% reduction of oil in the reserve since 2010.

The legislation is summarized below:

 The Bipartisan Budget Act (Section 404), enacted in 2015, includes authorization for funding an SPR modernization program to support improvements deemed necessary to preserve the long-term integrity and utility of SPR's infrastructure by selling up to $2 billion worth of SPR crude oil in fiscal years 2017 through 2020. Although the estimated volumes presented in the chart above are based on an assumed oil price of $50 per barrel, the actual final sales volumes will depend on how SPR decides to allocate the sales volumes across those fiscal years and the actual price of crude oil at the time of the sales. For the Section 404 sales, SPR must get an appropriation from Congress to approve its requested sales revenue target.
 Another section of the Bipartisan Budget Act (Section 403), enacted in 2015, mandates SPR crude oil sales for fiscal years 2018 through 2025 on a volumetric basis, rather than on a dollar basis, as specified in Section 404. The revenues from sales authorized under section 403 will be deposited into the general fund of the U.S. Department of the Treasury.
 The Fixing America’s Surface Transportation Act, enacted in December 2015, calls for SPR sales totaling 66 million barrels from fiscal years 2023 through 2025.
 The 21st Century Cures Act, enacted in December 2016, calls for the sale of 25 million barrels of SPR crude oil for fiscal years 2017 through 2019. The first portion of these sales is expected in late spring 2017.
 The Tax Cuts and Jobs Act of 2017, enacted in December 2017, calls for the sale of 7 million barrels over the two-year period of FY 2026 through FY 2027.
 The Bipartisan Budget Act of 2018, enacted in February 2018, calls for the sale of 30 million barrels over the four-year period of FY 2022 through FY 2025, 35 million barrels in FY 2026, and 35 million barrels in FY 2027.
 On March 1, 2022, President Biden announced the release of 30 million barrels of oil from the reserve in response to Russia's invasion of Ukraine.
On March 31, 2022, President Biden announced that his administration would release 1 million barrels of oil per day from the reserve for the next 180 days.

See also

References

Further reading
 Beaubouef, Bruce A.  The Strategic Petroleum Reserve: U.S. Energy Security and Oil Politics, 1975-2005 (Texas A&M University Press, 2007).
 Strait, Albert L. Strategic Petroleum Reserve (Nova Science Publishers, 2010).

External links

 Official website

Energy infrastructure in the United States
Energy security
Oil storage
Petroleum economics
Petroleum in the United States
Strategic reserves of the United States
United States Department of Energy facilities
United States federal energy legislation